Guy Forget and Yannick Noah were the defending champions but only Forget competed that year with Boris Becker.

Becker and Forget won in the final 6–4, 6–4 against Jorge Lozano and Todd Witsken.

Seeds
The top four seeded teams received byes into the second round.

Draw

Finals

Top half

Bottom half

External links
 1988 Newsweek Champions Cup Doubles Draw

Newsweek Champions Cup Doubles